A tumulus is a mound of earth and stones raised over a grave or graves.

Tumulus may also refer to:

 Tumulus culture, culture that dominated Central Europe during the Middle Bronze Age (ca.1600 BC to 1200 BC)
 Tumulus (band), a progressive folk metal band from Yaroslavl Russia
 Pressure ridge (lava), in volcanology, sometimes referred to as a tumulus

See also
 Kurgan (disambiguation)